The following is a list of ice hockey teams in Ontario, past and present. It includes the league(s) they play for, and championships won.

Major professional

National Hockey League

Current teams

Former teams

National Hockey Association

World Hockey Association

Minor professional

American Hockey League

Current teams

Former teams

Canadian Women's Hockey League

ECHL

International Hockey League

United Hockey League

Early leagues

Junior

Ontario Hockey League

Current teams

Former teams

United States Hockey League

Former teams

Junior A Hockey Leagues

Central Junior A Hockey League

Greater Metro Junior A Hockey League

Northern Ontario Junior Hockey League
As of 2020–21 season

Ontario Provincial Junior A Hockey League
 

↑Many teams' establishment dates precede the founding of the OPJHL in 1993.  This heading lists only OPJHL championships won.

Superior International Junior Hockey League
As of the 2020–21 season

Junior B Hockey Leagues

Junior C and Development Hockey Leagues

Semi-professional, senior and amateur

Canadian Women's Hockey League

National Women's Hockey League

Senior

Amateur

University

League, regional and national championships

See also

Hockey Northwestern Ontario
Northern Ontario Hockey Association
Ontario Minor Hockey Association
Ontario Hockey Association
Ontario Hockey Federation
Hockey Eastern Ontario
1999 Memorial Cup
2002 Memorial Cup
2005 Memorial Cup

References

Ontario teams

Ice hockey teams
Ice hockey teams in Ontario